A Yellow Raft in Blue Water is the debut novel of author Michael Dorris, published in 1987. It tells the story of three generations of Native American women: Rayona, who is half African-American, her mother Christine, and Christine's mother Aunt Ida. The story is told in three distinct sections, one for each woman. Throughout the book, themes of family, identity, and heritage are highlighted and examined.

Rayona

The novel begins with Rayona visiting her mother Christine in the hospital. Christine and Elgin, Rayona's father, do not get along, and Christine makes Elgin so angry that he refuses to come collect her from the hospital once she is discharged. Rayona and Christine drive to Aunt Ida's house on the reservation, where Christine leaves Rayona to get to know her grandmother. Rayona, angry at her mother, runs away and meets a priest of her school, Father Tom, and he takes her on a road trip, claiming to bring her to a retreat for teens. They stop at a park, where Father Tom molests Rayona. She gets shipped off to Seattle, by Father Tom, who puts the blame on her about the molestation, but Rayona still returns to work at Bear Paw State Park for a little while. Here, she meets workers Sky and Evelyn and stays with them for a bit before returning to the reservation. She rides in the local rodeo in the place of her cousin, who is drunk. The owner of the horse she rides turns out to be her mother's old boyfriend, Dayton, with whom Christine is staying. Although angry at first because Rayona left Aunt Ida's without leaving any information about her whereabouts, Christine eventually reconciles with her daughter.

Christine

The second section of the novel is Christine's story.  Christine has a brother named Lee, who is the handsomest boy in town. Christine doubts that she and Lee have the same father, since Lee is gorgeous and Christine is not, but Aunt Ida won't tell them. Christine and Lee aren't allowed to call Aunt Ida "mom" because she tells them was never married and feels it's not right. Christine is attracted to her brother's friend Dayton. During the Vietnam War, Christine receives mail from Dayton saying Lee is Missing In Action.

Christine, that night, is at a bar where she meets Elgin, a soldier who promises to bring Lee back. Christine thinks she has finally found love, especially at first sight, but it is lust at first sight. Elgin and Christine conceive Rayona in Tacoma, and they soon get married. Not able to have sex with Christine was taxing on Elgin, and he is gone most of the time, always in and out of Christine's life. She finally leaves and goes to the reservation.

Christine finds out she had worn herself down with all the alcohol, and she only has six months to live.

Christine gets weaker and can handle only one task a day. Dayton fixed her old car and Christine and Dayton decided to teach Rayona how to drive. One day while Dayton and Rayona are at a stud appointment for their horse, Father Tom appears at the house and drops off a bottle of pain pills, but leaves quickly after Christine starts to say that Aunt Ida had mentioned something about him. Dayton comes back and describes the trouble he had with his horse at the stud: the horses had fallen in love and did not want to be separated. That afternoon Christine gives Rayona her prize silver ring as a gesture of reconciliation.

Ida

Ida's aunt Clara arrives on the reservation to help with Annie, Ida's sick mother. Ida and her sister Pauline are excited to have a sophisticated city girl in the house.

Clara gets pregnant with Lecon's baby (Lecon being Ida's father). Clara and Ida then move to a convent, and Ida promises to be the legal mother of Christine at the stunning age of 15. The nuns tell her to be called "Aunt Ida" instead of mother, since she and Christine are technically sisters.

Clara visits a few times, threatening to take Christine and put her up for adoption, but Ida refuses every time.

Several years later, Willard Pretty Dog, returns from the war. Willard was once the most attractive boy on the reservation, but is now rumored to be hideously deformed from combat injuries. Ida helps to take care of him, and then Ida gets pregnant with Willard's baby, with whom she names Lee. After Willard undergoes serious plastic surgery and is handsome as he was before, he tells his mother that "Ida may not be pretty or smart, but she was there for me when no one else was." Ida is heartbroken and breaks off the relationship between them.

Ida lives her life with Christine and Lee, revealing her favoritism towards Christine and her dislike for Lee, claiming he is whiny and always needs attention, contradictory to Christine's belief that Ida likes Lee more.

Christine and Ida on the roof of their house, awaiting the end of the world as predicted in a chain letter Christine received. Ida does not believe in the letter, but she is willing to humor Christine. The final lines describe Ida pantomiming the action of braiding, symbolizing the intertwining destinies of family.

Characters in A Yellow Raft in Blue Water
Rayona Diane Taylor – a main protagonist; daughter of Christine and Elgin
Christine George Taylor – a main protagonist; mother of Rayona
Aunt Ida George – a main protagonist; legal mother of Christine
Elgin Taylor – Christine's (separated) husband; Rayona's father
Lee George – Christine's brother
Dayton Nickles – Lee's friend
Father Hurlburt – priest at the reservation mission; Ida's close friend
Father Tom Novak – assistant priest at the reservation mission.
Pauline George Cree – Ida's sister
Dale Cree – Pauline's husband; Foxy's father
Polly Cree – Dale's mother
Buster Cree – Dale's father
Willard Pretty Dog – a reservation man and veteran; biological father of Lee
Mrs. Pretty Dog – Willard's mother
Kennedy "Foxy" Cree – Rayona's cousin; son of Pauline
Annabelle Stiffarm – Foxy's girlfriend
Clara – Annie's sister; Christine's biological mother
Annie George – Ida and Pauline's mother; Lecon's wife
Lecon George  – Ida, Pauline, and Christine's father; Annie's husband
Ellen DeMarco – lifeguard at Bearpaw Lake
Mr. and Mrs. DeMarco – Ellen's parents
Norman "Sky" Dial – owner of the Conoco gas station near Bearpaw Lake; husband of Evelyn Dial
Evelyn Dial – chef at Bearpaw Lake; wife of Sky
Charlene – Seattle pharmacist; Christine's friend and neighbor
Mr. McCutcheon – Bearpaw Lake maintenance supervisor
John, Andy, and Dave – other Bearpaw Lake employees

References

Dorris, Michael, and James Patrick. Duffy. A Yellow Raft in Blue Water Michael Dorris. New York: Spark Pub., 2002. Print.

External links
 SparkNotes
 Books of the Times, Multiple Perspectives
 Eccentricity was all They Could Afford
 Michael Dorris Dies At 52, Wrote of His Son's Suffering
 Alcohol's Child a Father Tells His Tale
At The Movies
 NY Times Books Reviews

1987 American novels
Native American novels
Novels set in Montana
Books about Native Americans
Novels set in Washington (state)
Henry Holt and Company books
1987 debut novels